A stool test is a medical diagnostic technique that involves the collection and analysis of fecal matter. Microbial analysis (culturing), microscopy and chemical tests are among the tests performed on stool samples.

Collection
Stool samples should be sent to the laboratory as soon as possible after collection and should not be refrigerated prior to receipt by the laboratory.

Visual examination
The patient and/or health care worker in the office or at the bedside is able to make some important observations.

 Color  
 Texture/consistency—formed
 Classify type of feces (diagnostic triad for irritable bowel syndrome) based on Bristol stool scale

Cancer screening
Fecal occult blood test and fecal immunochemical test are the most common stool tests to diagnose many conditions that caused by bleeding in the gastrointestinal system, including colorectal cancer or stomach cancer.  Cancers, and to a lesser extent, precancerous lesions, shed abnormal cells into the stool. Cancers and precancerous lesions (polyps) that are ulcerated or rubbed by passing stool also may shed blood into the stool, which can be identified by a hemoglobin assay.  

The American Cancer Society and the U.S. Preventive Services Task Force recommended colorectal cancer screening with a fecal immunochemical test every year, or  a multi-target stool DNA test for every three years from the age of 45. Other options include a sigmoidoscopy or virtual colonoscopy (CT colonography) for every five years or a colonoscopy for every 10 years.
Fecal occult blood test is no longer recommended due to the high false-positive rate as well as the dietary and pharmaceutical restrictions. The National Committee for Quality Assurance (NCQA) issued an update to the Healthcare Effectiveness Data and Information Set (HEDIS) for 2017, while the guideline remains for the patients aged 50 or over.

A multi-target stool DNA test was approved in August 2014 by the FDA as a screening test for non-symptomatic, average-risk adults 50 years or older. A 2017 study found this testing to be less cost effective compared to colonoscopy or fecal occult blood testing. Three-year multi-target stool DNA test has been estimated to cost $11,313 per quality-adjusted life year (QALY) compared with no screening.

Microbiology tests

Parasitic diseases such as ascariasis, hookworm, strongyloidiasis and whipworm can be diagnosed by examining stools under a microscope for the presence of worm larvae or eggs. Some bacterial diseases can be detected with a stool culture. Toxins from bacteria such as Clostridium difficile ("C. diff.") can also be identified. Viruses such as rotavirus can also be found in stools.

Chemical tests
A fecal pH test may be used to determine lactose intolerance or the presence of an infection. Steatorrhea can be diagnosed using a fecal fat test, which checks for the malabsorption of fat.

Faecal elastase levels are becoming the mainstay of pancreatitis diagnosis.

See also

 Rectal examination

References